When Joseph Met Maria was a television Christmas special featuring several 'Maria' and 'Joseph' finalists from Andrew Lloyd Webber's BBC talent searches How Do You Solve A Problem Like Maria? (2006) and Any Dream Will Do (2007), including winners Connie Fisher and Lee Mead. It was aired on BBC One on 24 December 2007 and was presented by Graham Norton.

When Joseph Met Maria showed what several of the finalists were up to since taking part in the live shows. It also featured several performances from the selected finalists, as well as judges John Barrowman, who performed with the Marias, and Denise Van Outen, who performed with the Josephs. Also present were judges Bill Kenwright and Zoe Tyler.

Finalists
The finalists from each series present were:

Marias

Josephs

Songs

Kerst Met Joseph en Evita
A similar special, entitled Kerst Met Joseph en Evita (Christmas with Joseph and Evita) was aired on Christmas Eve 2008, uniting several 'Evita' and 'Joseph' finalists from the Dutch versions, Op zoek naar Evita and Op zoek naar Joseph including winners Brigitte Heitzer and Freek Bartels.

References

External links
 

BBC Television shows
British reality television series
Singing talent shows
2007 television specials
British television specials